Death Magic is the third studio album by American noise rock band Health. It was released by Loma Vista Recordings on August 7, 2015, six years after the band's previous album, Get Color.

Track listing

Notes
  signifies a co-producer
  signifies an additional producer

Personnel
Credits adapted from the liner notes of Death Magic.

Health
 Jacob Duzsik
 John Famiglietti
 Jupiter Keyes
 Benjamin Miller

Additional personnel
 The Haxan Cloak – production 
 Lars Stalfors – co-production ; production ; additional production ; mixing 
 Andrew Dawson – co-production ; production 
 Justin Raisen – co-production 
 Joe LaPorta – mastering
 John Famiglietti – art direction
 Andrew Pham – design

Charts

References

2015 albums
Albums produced by Justin Raisen
Health (band) albums